Wayne Rasmussen (born June 7, 1942) is a former American football safety who played for the Detroit Lions. After his football career, he spent many years as an executive for Citibank at their Sioux Falls, South Dakota location, and is now retired in the Sioux Falls area.

Rasmussen graduated from Howard High School, located in Howard, South Dakota. Rasmussen played football, basketball and baseball at South Dakota State University.  As point guard, he led South Dakota State to the NCAA Division II National Championship in 1963 and was named the tournament's Most Outstanding Player.  Also, as a football player in college, he played wide receiver as well as defensive back.

He is an inductee of the South Dakota Sports Hall of Fame.

References

External links
 Rasmussen's South Dakota Sports Hall of Fame page

1942 births
Living people
American football safeties
American football wide receivers
Basketball players from Chicago
Detroit Lions players
Point guards
South Dakota State Jackrabbits football players
South Dakota State Jackrabbits men's basketball players
Players of American football from Chicago
Sportspeople from Sioux Falls, South Dakota
American men's basketball players